Cellulomonas hominis is a bacterium from the genus Cellulomonas which has been isolated from cerebrospinal fluid in Switzerland.

References

 

Micrococcales
Bacteria described in 1996